Passalus is a genus of beetles of the family Passalidae.

Species
This list is a partial list of species
 Passalus barrus Boucher & Reyes-Castillo, 1991 
 Passalus bucki Luederwaldt, 1931 
 Passalus coniferus Eschscholtz, 1829 
 Passalus convexus Dalman, 1817 
 Passalus elfriedae Luederwaldt, 1931 
 Passalus epiphanoides (Kuwert, 1891) 
 Passalus glaberrimus Eschscholtz, 1829 
 Passalus interruptus (Linneo, 1758) 
 Passalus interstitialis Eschscholtz, 1829 
 Passalus pugionifer (Kuwert, 1891) 
 Passalus punctatostriatus Percheron, 1835 
 Passalus punctiger LePeletier & Serville, 1825 
 Passalus rhodocanthopoides (Kuwert, 1891) 
 Passalus variiphyllus (Kuwert, 1891)

References

 Biolib
 Hallan, Joel  Synopsis of the described Coleoptera of the World

Passalidae
Taxa named by Johan Christian Fabricius
Scarabaeoidea genera